

UN Arabic Language Day is observed annually on December 18.  The event was established by the UN Educational, Scientific and Cultural Organization (UNESCO) in 2010 seeking "to celebrate multilingualism and cultural diversity as well as to promote equal use of all six of its official working languages throughout the organization". December 18 was chosen as the date for the Arabic language as it is "the day in 1973 when the General Assembly approved Arabic as an official UN language".

See also 
 International Mother Language Day
 International observance
 Official languages of the United Nations
 AIDA - International Association of Arabic Dialectology

References

External links 
 UN Arabic Language Day - Official Site (Arabic)
 World Arabic Language Day - UNESCO page

Arabic language
December observances
Arabic